Beekman Verplanck Hoffman (born in Poughkeepsie, New York, 28 November 1789; died in Jamaica, Long Island, 10 December 1834) was a United States Navy officer.

Biography

He entered the Navy as midshipman on 4 July 1805, was commissioned lieutenant on 21 May 1812, and commander on 5 March 1817, and reached the grade of captain on 7 March 1829. He served first in the Argus under Captain Trippe, and was attached later to the frigate Constitution, and participated in all her battles.

In 1826 he was the first commanding officer of the sloop of war USS Boston.

Notes

References

1789 births
1834 deaths
United States Navy officers